Krissy Scurfield (born 15 June 2003) is a Canadian rugby union player.

Biography 
A student at the University of Victoria, Scurfield was the only Canadian woman named to the World Rugby Series’ Dream Team in 2022 and was the Canadian’s top try scorer despite only featuring in half the games. Scurfield was selected to play for Canada at the 2022 Commonwealth Games in rugby sevens.

Scurfield competed for Canada at the 2022 Rugby World Cup Sevens in Cape Town. They placed sixth overall after losing to Fiji in the fifth place final.

References

2003 births
Living people
Female rugby union players
Canadian female rugby union players
21st-century Canadian women
Rugby sevens players at the 2022 Commonwealth Games